The men's discus throw event at the 2002 Asian Athletics Championships was held in Colombo, Sri Lanka on 12 August.

Results

References

2002 Asian Athletics Championships
Discus throw at the Asian Athletics Championships